Mauritius Post is the company responsible for postal service in Mauritius.  The first postal service was established in 1772 by Pierre Nicolas Lambert, the King’s Printer, when Mauritius was under French rule.  The service began on 21 December 1772 with eight messengers. Rural post offices were established in 1790.

See also 
 Blue Penny Museum
 Mauritius "Post Office"
 Postage stamps and postal history of Mauritius
 Postal codes in Mauritius

External links
Official Website

Logistics companies of Mauritius
Postal organizations
Philately of Mauritius